Versus (Latin, 'against') may refer to:

Film and television 
 Versus (2000 film), a Japanese zombie film
 Versus (2016 film), a Russian sports drama film
 Versus (2019 film), a French thriller film
 Versus (TV channel), former name of NBCSN, an American sports channel
 "Versus", an episode of Ninjago

Music 
 Versus, a trope in medieval music
 Versus (band), an American rock band

Albums 
 Versus (Carl Craig album), 2017
 Versus (Diaura album), 2017
 Versus (Emarosa album), 2014
 Versus (Kings of Convenience album), 2001
 Versus (Little Ghost album), 2015
 Versus (Mikael Gabriel album), 2015
 Versus (Mr. Children album), 1993
 Versus (The Haunted album), 2008
 Versus, a 2017 album by Gloria Trevi with Alejandra Guzmán
 VersuS, a 2019 album by Vitaa with Slimane
 Versus (EP), by Usher, 2010

Songs 
 "Versus", a 2015 single by Area 11
 "Versus", a song by Convergerack from the 2006 album No Heroes
 "Versus", a song by Jay-Z from the 2013 album Magna Carta Holy Grail
 "Versus", a song by Ladytron from the 2008 album Velocifero
 "Versus", a song by Moonspell from the 2012 album Alpha Noir/Omega White
 "Versus", a 2000 single by Tomcraft
 "Versus", a song by Within the Ruins from the 2010 album Invade
 "Versus", a song from the soundtrack of Danganronpa Another Episode: Ultra Despair Girls

Other uses 
 Versus (journal), an Italian semiotics journal
 Versus programming language
 Versus (Versace), the diffusion line of Italian fashion house Versace
 Legal cases are typically cited as "Smith versus Jones" (and written as Smith v Jones or longer Smith vs. Jones)
Scientific diagrams can show a plot of something on the x-axis versus something else on the y-axis

See also 
 Verses (disambiguation)
 VS (disambiguation)
 V (disambiguation)
 Case citation, used by legal professionals to identify court case decisions
 Mashup (music)
 Comparative advertising
 Verzuz, an American webcast show